Telyanino is a rural locality (a village) in Argunovskoye Rural Settlement, Nikolsky District, Vologda Oblast, Russia. The population was 107 as of 2002.

Geography 
Telyanino is located 51 km northwest of Nikolsk (the district's administrative centre) by road. Krasnaya Zvezda is the nearest rural locality.

References 

Rural localities in Nikolsky District, Vologda Oblast